Zsuzsanna "Zsuzsa" Nagy (born 14 November 1951) is a retired Hungarian gymnast. She competed at the 1972 Summer Olympics in all artistic gymnastics events and won a bronze medal in the team competition. Her best individual result was 34th place on the balance beam. She won another bronze team medal at the 1974 World Artistic Gymnastics Championships.

References

External links 
 

1951 births
Hungarian female artistic gymnasts
Living people
Gymnasts at the 1972 Summer Olympics
Olympic gymnasts of Hungary
Olympic bronze medalists for Hungary
Olympic medalists in gymnastics
Medalists at the 1972 Summer Olympics
Medalists at the World Artistic Gymnastics Championships
Gymnasts from Budapest